Floris Michael Neusüss (3 March 1937 – 1 April 2020) was a German photographer.

Biography
Floris Neusüss was born in Lennep, Germany, on 3 March 1937. He began as a painter the took up photography which he studied at the Wuppertal School of Arts and Crafts in North Rhine-Westphalia, before continuing at the Bavarian State Institute of Photography in Munich. He trained alongside photographer Heinz Hajek-Halke at the Berlin University of the Arts. In 1957, he began making photograms and photomontages.

In the autumn of 1960 he began to expose whole human bodies on black and white paper. From 1962 onwards, he predominantly used black and white reversal paper for these "body pictures". This not only emphasises their shadowiness, but for Neusüss - coming from painting - "the form-giving element in my pictures has primarily been black."   Fritz Gruber gave the works, on which significantly naked female bodies leave their imprints, the significant name "Nudogramme". The Cologne photo collector also showed these nudograms in 1963 as part of a special exhibition at the photokina in Cologne, which attracted a great deal of attention. From 1964 Neusüss has also experimented with chemical painting on photograms. By the end of the 1970s Neusüss brought the photogram out of the darkroom and out of the studio to the objects recording motifs not with a camera but rather a folder with photo paper, on which he exposed subjects such as plants or windows. He also continued to explore the body-photograms bringing them into a performative context as for instance 1977 in Arles or experimenting with silhouette like life-size portraits, including several using his friend and frequent collaborator, Robert Heinecken as the subject. In his later years, in collaboration with his wife Renate Heyne, he was particularly concerned with museums and collections, where they worked mainly in the dark of the night to capture large-format objects on photographic paper, such as those of Greek statues from the Glypothek in Munich.

Neusüss always strictly separated the photogram as a contact image from camera photography.  According to this interpretation, the original object touched the image;

In 1979, at the Centro de Arte Contemporânea in Porto (followed by Coimbra and Lisbon) Neusüss coordinated A Fotografia como Arte bringing together work by  European artists (Bernd and Hilla Becher, Arnulf Rainer, Jürgen Klauke, Jochen Gerz, Nils Udo, Christian Boltanski) and Portuguese artists (Fernando Calhau, Julião Sarmento, Helena Almeida, Alberto Carneiro and Ângelo de Sousa).

In 1982 and 1985, Neusüss exhibited works which displayed the maladies of pollution, which aroused strong reactions. In the early 1980s, he exhibited Artificial Landscapes, chemical works of abstract art that resembles small buildings on a horizon.

In 1984, he began designing Nachtbilder ('nocturnal pictures'), photographs taken outside at night and produced by placing photo paper emulsion side down into a woodland or garden at night during a thunderstorm during which it might be tumbled about by the wind and exposed by lightning.

At Lacock Abbey in Wiltshire, England, in 1978 Neusüss had realized one of his first outdoor photograms, recording on large size black and white paper at night the window that formed the subject of William Henry Fox Talbot's first photographic negative, made there in 1835. 2010 Neusüss reenacted his early project recording the same window in colour on Ilfochrome paper.  The work was presented in Shadow Catchers, 13 October 2010 - 20 February 2011 at the Victoria and Albert Museum, London. Curator of the show Martin Barnes described  Neusüss' work as "a poetic dialogue between presence and absence".

Teaching 
From 1966 Neusüss taught as a freelance lecturer at the Kassel Art College and in 1972  was appointed professor of photography there. In 1972 he founded the college gallery Fotoforum Kassel for conceptual photography, which became one of the most eminente centers for photography organizing exhibitions and symposia on conceptual and experimental photography. Since 2005 the collection of the Fotoforum Kassel is part of the photographic collection of the Stiftung Moritzburg in Halle. In 2002, aged 65, he retired. Neusüss was a full member of the Mitglied im Deutschen Künstlerbund (German Association of Artists).

Legacy 
Through this work, Nesüss established himself as one of the leaders in experimental photography. His teaching as Professor of Experimental Photography at the University of Kassel was influential. In the 1980s, Neusüss also experimented with colour photograms and collages which through his teaching at Kassel had an effect on the style of several generations of photographers.

Neusüss died in 2020 and his photograms are currently held in the collections of the Art Institute of Chicago; the Museum of Modern Art in New York;  the Getty Museum in Los Angeles; the Los Angeles County Museum of Art; the Victoria and Albert Museum, London; and the Museum of Fine Arts, Houston. There are several monographs published on his work and he produced several textbooks and collections of photograms.

Exhibitions 
 2010: Shadow Catchers, Victoria and Albert Museum, London.
2018: Ferner Zeiten Schatten-Fotogramme. Schadow-Haus des Bundestages, Berlin
 2017: Intent and Gesture: Photograms - Color (1966–2007), solo exhibition, Von Lintel Gallery, Los Angeles
 2016: Leibniz' Lager, Einzelausstellung, Zentrum für Kunst und Medientechnologie, Karlsruhe
 2015: Dreams + Photograms, solo exhibition, Von Lintel Gallery, Los Angeles
 2014: What is a photograph?, January 31-May 4, 2014, International Center of Photography, New York.
2012/13: Ancient and Modern, 8 Nov 2012 – 12 Jan 2013, Atlas Gallery, London
 2012: Traumbilder – Bilderträumer, Frühe Kamerafotografien und Fotoaktionen von Floris Neusüss, Münchner Stadtmuseum
2010: Solo Exhibition, 15 Oct – 27 Nov 2010, Atlas Gallery, London
2009: Early Works, 13 Jun – 2 Aug 2009, Fondazione Sozzani, Milan
2007: Retrospective, 20 Apr – 9 Jun 2007,  Atlas Gallery, London
2007: Floris Neusüss Photograms, 27 Apr – 2 Jun 2007,  Atlas Gallery, London
2007: Kameralose Fotografie; Fotogramme, 31 Mar – 4 May 2007, Kleinschmidt, Wiesbaden
2007: Fotogramme, 3 Feb – 24 Mar 2007, Villa Grisebach Gallery, Germany
 2005: Vor Troja – Antikenfotogramme, Winckelmann-Museum, Stendal
2004: Helden, Herrscher und Passanten, 5 Jun – 8 Aug 2004, Georg Kolbe Museum, Berlin
 1997: Participation in the 45th annual exhibition of the German Association of Artists in Wismar and Rostock
1983: Fotogramme–die lichtreichen Schatten, Fotomuseum des Münchner Stadtmuseums, Kassel.
 1977: Kunstverein Kassel, Kassel

Posthumous 

 2021: Floris Neusüss : 50 Years, September 11 – October 27, Von Lintel Gallery, Bergamot Station, Santa Monica, California

Collections 

 Art Institute of Chicago
 Houston Museum of Fine Arts
 Getty Museum
 Los Angeles County Museum of Art
 Victoria and Albert Museum, London

Publications 
 
 
 
 
 
 
 
 
 
 
 Neusüss, Floris Michael, & Schweizerische Stiftung für die Photographie Kunsthaus Zürich;. (1990). Anwesenheit bei Abwesenheit: Fotogramme und die Kunst des 20. Jahrhunderts.
Neusüss, Floris Michael (1983). Fotogramme–die lichtreichen Schatten, Ausst. Kat. Fotomuseum des Münchner Stadtmuseums, Kassel.

References

1937 births
2020 deaths
20th-century German photographers
21st-century German photographers
Berlin University of the Arts alumni
People from Remscheid
Photographers from North Rhine-Westphalia